The following is an alphabetical list of members of the United States House of Representatives from the state of Iowa.  For chronological tables of members of both houses of the United States Congress from the state (through the present day), see United States congressional delegations from Iowa.  The list of names should be complete, but other data may be incomplete.

Current members
 : Mariannette Miller-Meeks (R, since 2021)
 : Ashley Hinson (R, since 2021) 
 : Zach Nunn (R, since 2023) 
 : Randy Feenstra (R, since 2021)

List of members and delegates

See also

List of United States senators from Iowa
United States congressional delegations from Iowa
Iowa's congressional districts

Iowa
 
United States rep